The best-selling video game of all-time on the Atari 2600 console (previously known as the Atari VCS) is Pac-Man, a port of the arcade game of the same name programmed by Tod Frye. Originally created by Toru Iwatani and released in 1980, Pac-Man was later ported to many home video game consoles, beginning with the Atari 2600 in 1982. Within months it became the best-selling home video game of all-time, with more than 1.5 million units pre-ordered by customers before its release. Pac-Man went on to sell over 8 million units worldwide.

The second best-selling Atari 2600 game is Space Invaders, a port of the 1978 Taito arcade game that was programmed by Rick Maurer, which was the first video game to sell a million copies. It went on to sell over  copies, and was the best-selling Atari VCS game up until Pac-Man. The other three titles among the top five best-selling Atari 2600 games are Pitfall! (designed by David Crane for Activision), Donkey Kong (a port of the 1981 Nintendo arcade game programmed by Garry Kitchen for Coleco), and Frogger (a port of the Konami and Sega arcade game programmed by Ed English for Parker Brothers), each having sold over 4 million units.

Of the top 28 best-selling Atari 2600 video games, 15 were developed and/or published by the console's manufacturer, Atari, Inc. Other publishers with multiple entries in the top 20 are Activision (six titles), Imagic (three titles) and Parker Brothers (two titles). Three of the games in the top 20 were programmed by David Crane, three by Howard Scott Warshaw, three by Rob Fulop, and two by Bradley G. Stewart.

Video games

See also
List of best-selling video games

Notes

References

External links
Atari official website

Atari 2600